was a Japanese Communist Party member. He was born in Yamaguchi Prefecture on 20 March 1892. He joined the party in January 1923. He was arrested in April 1929. He died in prison in March 1945.

See also
Japanese dissidence during the Shōwa period

External links

References

1892 births
1945 deaths
Japanese Communist Party politicians
Politicians from Yamaguchi Prefecture
Japanese editors
Japanese people who died in prison custody